Ganbatyn Jargalanchuluun (born July 13, 1986) is a Mongolian short track speed skater. Jargalanchuluun competed at the 2002 Winter Olympics in Salt Lake City, where he became the youngest Mongolian athlete to compete at the Winter Olympic Games at the age of 15 years and 225 days.

References

1986 births
Living people
Mongolian male short track speed skaters
Olympic short track speed skaters of Mongolia
Short track speed skaters at the 2002 Winter Olympics
21st-century Mongolian people